Kammavaari palem   is a village and mandal in Nellore district in the Indian state of Andhra Pradesh.

Demographics
 India census, Kammavaari palem had a population of 2000.  Kammavaari palem has an average literacy rate of 30%, lower than the national average of 59.5%.

References

Villages in Nellore district